William Heron may refer to:

William Heron (High Sheriff of Northumberland), High Sheriff of Northumberland 1257–1258
William Heron (MP) for Northumberland (UK Parliament constituency) in 1371
William Heron (died 1428), in 1428 attacked Etal Castle
William Heron, in 1821, owner of Dalmore House and Estate
William Thomas Heron (1897–1988), American psychologist